The 1946 Lincoln Lions football team was an American football team that represented Lincoln University of Pennsylvania as a member of the Colored Intercollegiate Athletic Association (CIAA) during the 1946 college football season. In their 12th season under head coach Manuel Rivero, the team compiled a 6–3 record and outscored opponents by a total of 235 to 107. 

The Dickinson System rated Lincoln as the No. 20 black college football team for 1946.

Schedule

References

Lincoln
Lincoln Lions football seasons
Lincoln Lions football